Spens or SPENS may refer to:

People
 Clan Spens, a kindred from the Scottish Lowlands
 Baron Spens, a title in the Peerage of the United Kingdom
 Spens (musician), Bulgarian hip-hop artist
 Janet Spens, Scottish academic
 Sir Patrick Spens, an early Scottish Ballad
 Patrick Spens, 1st Baron Spens, British lawyer, judge and Conservative politician
 Will Spens, Cambridge academic and educationist
 Sir James Spens / friherre Jacob Spens; Scottish adventurer, soldier and diplomat, and the first Swedish Baron Spens

Other
 Spens clause, a mechanism for adjusting the redemption price of a bond on early repayment
 SPC Vojvodina, commonly known as SPENS, a multi-purpose venue in Novi Sad, Serbia

See also
 Spence (disambiguation)